Under the Tuscan Sun may refer to:

Under the Tuscan Sun (book), a 1996 memoir by Frances Mayes
Under the Tuscan Sun (film), a 2003 American film, based on the memoir